Seyyed Hoseyn Kalah Fatah Ali (also Romanized as Seyyed Hoseyn Kalāh Fataḥ ʿAlī) is a village in Teshkan Rural District, Chegeni District, Dowreh County, Lorestan Province, Iran. At the 2006 census, its population was 54, in 10 families.

References 

Towns and villages in Dowreh County